The Story of Sinuhe (also referred to as Sanehat) is a work of ancient Egyptian literature. It was likely composed in the beginning of the Twelfth Dynasty after the death of Amenemhat I (also referred to as Senworset I). The tale describes an Egyptian man who flees his kingdom, and lives as a foreigner before returning to Egypt shortly before his death. It explores universal themes such as divine providence and mercy. The oldest known copy of the text dates to the reign of Amenemhat III, around 1800 BCE. The work was so popular within Egypt that newer copies have been found ranging up to 750 years after the original.

Summary
The Story of Sinuhe is written in verse and opens with a wording similarly stylized like other autobiographical coffin texts that are common in Middle Kingdom Egyptian Tombs. Theoretically, the Story of Sinuhe would have been inscribed on his supposed tomb. The opening stanzas list Sinuhe’s accomplishments, titles, and ways he was of service to the royal family. Sinuhe claims to be, “...the True Acquaintance of the King, whom he loves, the follower, Sinuhe says, I was a follower who followed his lord, a servant of the royal chambers".  Then it breaks away from this styling and transitions to Sinuhe receiving the news of the sudden death of the old king while he is on an expedition in Libyia with the king’s oldest son. Upon hearing the news, Sinuhe is highly upset and enters a panicked state, “my heart staggered, my arms spread out; trembling fell on every limb. I removed myself, leaping, to look for a hiding place”. Sinuhe flees away from Egypt, sneaks past guards, crosses the Lake Maaty and sets out for foreign lands. He travels beyond Egypt and eventually collapses due to dehydration, having a close brush with death. In the next scene he is rescued by a Syrian leader who recognized Sinuhe, “a leader of theirs, who had once been in Egypt, recognized me. Then he gave me water, he boiled milk for me”.  Sinuhe is nursed back to health and eventually, after more travelling, meets Amunenshi, the ruler of upper Retjenu. He begins his new life and attempts to establish an identity amongst a culture he is unfamiliar with. Amunenshi entrusts him to command his armies, and it is through this command that Sinuhe becomes engaged in conflict with a challenger. Although Sinuhe is victorious in this conflict, it onsets a desperation for his homeland. At one point Sinuhe exclaims, “whatever god fated the flight—be gracious, and bring me home! Surely you will let me see the place where my heart still stays! What matters more than my being buried in the land where I was born?”. Luckily the new king, Senusret I, sends for Sinuhe to return to Egypt. Sinuhe is delighted and thus begins a lengthy correspondence between the King and Sinuhe. Sinuhe eventually writes to Senusret I,  “Whether I am at home, whether I am in this place—it is you who veils this horizon of mine”. Eventually the King offers to allow Sinuhe to be buried in Egypt. Sinuhe returns to Egypt and also the royal court. There he is cleansed and restored in his Egyptian identity. The story closes with Sinuhe addressing the visitors of his tomb, and the tale returns to its original funerary text stylization.

Sources 
One of the oldest versions of this text was found by James Edward Quibell in an expedition to western Thebes in 1896. The excavation took place in several Middle Kingdom tombs found in the back of the Ramesseum.  Here, Quibell found various fragments of papyri, later named the Ramesseum papyri. Many of these were of a medicinal subject matter, but literary texts have also been found, including the Story of Sinuhe. These fragments date back to the late 13th dynasty . Additionally, Quibell  and his team also found a small chest, reed pens and several other items of interest. In a discussion about this archaeological expedition, author Alan Gardiner made note of the fragility and poor condition that the papyrus was found in; “if a fragment of the material were pressed slightly between the finger and thumb it disappeared in a mere dust". This copy of the Story of Sinuhe is written in hieratic. Gardiner used information from Quibell’s findings as well as a later ostracon to work on an English translation of the text. As the early ostracon and combined fragments from the Quibelll expedition allowed for a more complete version of the tale. He published his work in translating the tale in 1916. Other authors have been able to build on his work and adjust their own translations as needed, one notable example being Alyward M. Blackman who published his own notes in 1936 based on Gardiners work.

Many other versions of the text have been found. Including some fragments from a New Kingdom Ostracon, and a duplicate of the text discovered in the Museum of Natural History of Buenos Aires, as well as many more papyrus. Most scholars on Egyptian literature agree that the large prevalence of sources indicate a widescale popularity of the Story of Sinuhe and that it had been copied in multitudes.

Interpretations
The tale is notable for its age, as well as the popularity of the story in ancient history. It explores themes and morals that were a part of Egyptian ideals, such as order and chaos, or identity and the soul. Sinuhe also demonstrates the value that Egyptians placed on their homeland—as Sinuhe only finds peace through being allowed to be buried in Egypt. Most authors agree in their discussion on Sinuhe that he represents a dichotomy between a loyal Egyptian and a deserter. While the story mostly takes place in Sinuhe’s time outside of Egypt, this retelling of Sinuhe’s life outside of Egyptian lands serves to encourage “reflection on the nature of Egyptian life, particularly on an individual’s relationship to the king”.

The autobiographical nature of the opening and closing of the tale is also significant. The traditional beginning in which the text is stylized as though it is written on Sinuhe’s tomb, listing his accomplishments and service to the royal family, is broken upon his fearful fleeing when the King Amenehmat I dies. The remaining stanzas of the story do not fit more traditional Egyptian narrative styles, at least until Sinuhe is able to return and be laid to rest in Egypt. This is a key narrative choice showing how Sinuhe is disconnected from traditional Egyptian culture once he departs from the safety and security of his homeland. Additionally, it is only when Sinuhe is sending his letters to the new king of Egypt, that examples of more traditional Egyptian stylization can be seen. Sinuhe praises the sender of the decree, King Senusret I, stating, “it is your spirit, Perfected God, Lord of the two lands, which is loved by the Sungod, and favored by Montu Lord of Thebes” he then goes on to list several gods in his praise. This form of writing is common in Middle Kingdom letters, and is another indication of Sinuhe only being able to experience Egyptian culture in direct connection to Egypt. In a similar vain, the name “Sinuhe” does not appear after the opening stanzas until after Sinuhe begins correspondence with the king again. Again showing Sinuhe’s disconnect from his heritage and identity upon his departure from Egypt.  

Some interpretations have also been made about the name Sinuhe. Sinuhe is derived from the Egyptian phrase sA-nht or “Son of the Sycamore Tree”. In Egyptian myth the Sycamore or, Tree of Life, is associated with Hathor, a fertility goddess. Many homophones and etymologically related words to the term “sycomore”, nht, have to do with death, escape, and protection. Which are all common themes throughout the tale. Essentially, Sinuhe’s name serves as etymological foreshadowing for the ideals and events that take place throughout the story. Additionally upon his fleeing Sinuhe crosses a body of water, associated with Maat, while in the vicinity of a Sycamore tree. Further emphasizing their connection and perhaps illustrating Sinuhe’s fleeing of his own identity.

There have also been some different opinions on Sinuhe’s reasoning for fleeing after the death of the king. Some state that many of Sinuhe’s fearful traits indicate that he is somehow involved in the king’s death. This would mean that he flees out of a need for self-preservation, making a rash decision that lands him outside of Egypt for the majority of his remaining life. The more common school of thought, the “impulsive school” as titled by author Meltzer, simply reads that Sinuhe’s decision to flee was merely an impulse of fear due to the impending disorder upon the king’s demise. As the king’s death seems to shock Sinuhe, it is commonly inferred that he was murdered or assassinated. This seems likely considering that the king Amenemhat whom is likely the king in the story, was assassinated. Another interpretation of his departure is that it was an attempt to escape the rule and power of the monarchy. And that during all of the commotion of the king’s death, Sinuhe saw his chance to escape and fled.

Parallels 
Parallels have been made between the biblical narrative of Joseph and the Story of Sinuhe. In what is seen as divine providence, Sinuhe the Egyptian flees to Syro-Canaan and becomes a member of the ruling elite, acquires a wife and family, before being reunited with his Egyptian family. In what is seen as divine providence, the Syro-Canaanite Joseph is taken to Egypt where he becomes part of the ruling elite, acquires a wife and family, before being reunited with his Syro-Canaanite family. Parallels have also been drawn from other biblical texts: the Hebrew prophet Jonah's frustrated flight from the orbit of God's power is likened to Sinuhe's similar flight from the King. The battle between David and Goliath is compared to Sinuhe's fight with a mighty challenger, whom he slays with a single blow, and the parable of the Prodigal Son is likened to Sinuhe's return home.

Additionally, the Story of Sinuhe inspired the modern novel Sinuhe the Egyptian (1945) by Mika Waltari.

References

Further reading
Barta, M. (2003). Sinuhe, the Bible and the Patriarchs, Czech Institute of Egyptology/David Brown Book Company.
Mahfouz, N. (2003). "The Return of Sinuhe" in Voices from the Other World (translated by Robert Stock), Random House.
Meltzer, E. S. (2004). "Sinuhe, Jonah and Joseph: Ancient ‘Far Travellers' and the Power of God", in: Ellens, J. H. et al. (eds.), God's Word for Our World, vol. II. Theological and Cultural Studies in Honor of Simon John De Vries (London-New York: Clark/Continuum), 77–81.
Morschauser, S. (2000). "What Made Sinuhe Run: Sinuhe's Reasoned Flight" in Journal of the American Research Center in Egypt  Vol. 37, 187–98
Parkinson, R. B. (1997). The Tale of Sinuhe and Other Ancient Egyptian Poems 1940–1640 BC (Oxford World Classics). Oxford: Oxford U. Press.
Quirke, S. 2004. Egyptian Literature 1800BC: Questions and Readings, Golden House.
Tobin, V. A. (1995). "The Secret of Sinuhe" Journal of the American Research Center in Egypt Vol. 32, 161–78.

External links
Translation which includes details on the sources for the translations, transcriptions from the original hieratic into Egyptian hieroglyphs.
Oxford Life of Sinuhe is a reading of the whole poem by actress Barbara Ewing.

Fiction set in the 2nd millennium BC
19th-century BC literature
Extra-biblical references to Canaan
Ancient Egyptian fiction
Novels set in ancient Egypt
Novels set in precolonial Africa
Egypt
Epic poems